Griqua may refer to:

 Griqua people
 Griqua language or Xiri language
 Griquas (rugby), a South African rugby team
 1362 Griqua, an outer main-belt asteroid
 Griqua asteroid, dynamical group of asteroids

Language and nationality disambiguation pages